William Taylor Fox was an Irish international footballer who played as a full back.

Fox played club football for Ulster, and earned two caps for Ireland at the 1887 British Home Championship.

External links
NIFG profile

Irish association footballers (before 1923)
Pre-1950 IFA international footballers
Ulster F.C. players
Year of birth missing
Year of death missing
Association football defenders